Tooheys Extra Dry, commonly referred to as a TED (Tooheys Extra Dry), is a dry style lager brewed by Lion in the Tooheys Brewery at Lidcombe, New South Wales, Australia. Lion has been owned by Japanese conglomerate Kirin Holdings Company Limited since 2009.

History
Tooheys Extra Dry is sold throughout Australia, though only available in bottles (345ml and 696ml) until late 2005 when it began to be sold on tap. 

It is the 5th most popular beer in Australia, by volume sold. 

In May 2006, Tooheys Extra Dry Platinum, a beer with increased alcohol content of 6.5% (later reduced to 5.2%), was launched, with the first shipment selling out in days. It is sold in 8-packs as opposed to the traditional 6-packs most bottled beers are packaged in.

Advertising

Tooheys Extra Dry is well known throughout Australia due to obscure television advertisements which include a walking tongue, fighting whitegoods, a farmer who clones himself, some cool-cats chasing a box of TED's, and the nocturnal migration of the Tooheys stag. 

In 2013, Tooheys Extra Dry launched Repay Your Mouth, a campaign encouraging drinkers to repay their mouth for prior abuses, highlighting the ‘Crisp Clean Taste’ of TED. Examples of ‘mouth abuse’ include kissing a dog, lying to your girlfriend, laughing at your boss’ unfunny jokes, and ignoring the 3 second rule.

Sponsorships

Continuing TED's history of sponsoring major events, it has been confirmed that in 2014, TED will be sponsoring events around Australia, including Surfest, Byron Bay Bluesfest, Rip Curl Pro, Nitro Circus, Spartan Race, and Tough Mudder.

See also

Australian pub
Beer in Australia
List of breweries in Australia

References

External links
 Official site

Kirin Group
Australian beer brands
Dry beer